Pedro Azabache Bustamante (Moche (Peru) January 31, 1918 - February 27, 2012) was a Peruvian painter, pupil of Julia Codesido and Jose Sabogal and was one of the few direct followers of indigenismo. He studied at the National School of Fine Arts in Lima where he joined in 1937. In June 1944 he presented his first solo show in the exclusive exposition rooms of the cultural institution "Insula" at the invitation of the poet José Gálvez Barrenechea. In 1962, he founded the School of Fine Arts Macedonio de la Torre in Trujillo city, which was its first director.

Work
The indigenist and costumbrist painter, in his paintings embodied the beautiful pictures of Moche, of their favorite saints, as the patron of farmers, San Isidro Labrador, the portrait of his mother and many others who have traveled the world. Your valuable artwork is admired at home and abroad for capturing landscapes and faces of the deepest Peru from coast and sierra.

See also

José Sabogal

References

1918 births
2012 deaths
Peruvian painters
Peruvian male painters
People from Trujillo, Peru
North Group (Trujillo)